Jericho Creek is a tributary of Laughery Creek in Ripley County, Indiana.

References

Rivers of Indiana
Rivers of Ripley County, Indiana